Rhyan Clapham, known by his stage name Dobby (stylised as DOBBY), is a Filipino-Aboriginal Australian musician. He describes himself as a "drapper", a contraction of rapper and drummer, although he also plays other instruments and is also a composer. He sometimes raps with the indie rock band Jackie Brown Jr, but on his own is mainly a hip hop artist.

He is known for his 2020 single "I can't breathe", featuring BARKAA, as well as other work. In 2022 he won the Archie Roach Foundation Award.

Early life and education
Rhyan Clapham was born in Wollongong. His mother had emigrated in 1985 from Tacloban in the Philippines, while his father is from Brewarrina, New South Wales, Australia. His father's mother was a Muruwari woman from Ngemba country in Brewarrina. He is a member of the Murrawarri Republic in Brewarrina.

Clapham studied classical piano in primary school from the age of seven, achieving AMEB Grade 6 in piano, and Grade 2 Musicianship. He then went on to study jazz drumming in high school, from age 14. He began listening to rappers like Outkast, Eminem, and 50 Cent, before turning to "more nuanced sounds of the culture", such as Lauryn Hill, Common, The Pharcyde, J Dilla, and MF DOOM.

He earned a Bachelor of Music degree at UNSW, specialising in percussion and piano. In 2015 he completed honours in Indigenous Studies, also at UNSW, focusing on Aboriginal hip hop music.

Musical career
Clapham describes himself as a "drapper", a contraction of the words rapper and drummer. He also plays piano.

He has performed at numerous festivals around Australia, including BIGSOUND (Queensland), Parrtjima in Alice Springs, Northern Territory (2021 and 2022), The Plot, and Yabun Festival, as well as many Koori Radio and NAIDOC celebratory events. He was a performer in Kevin Hunt's "Our music" concert at the Sydney Conservatorium, and has also performed at the Sydney Opera House, doing an entire 45-minute set to an empty Joan Sutherland auditorium, during the COVID-19 pandemic in Australia. He performed as part of the Wollongong Conservatorium of Music in California and Nevada in the US, and has also performed in Germany, the UK, and the Netherlands.

He has been developing his skills in music composition, being mentored by Chris Sainsbury (Indigenous composer and senior lecturer at ANU School of Music), and was supported by the Peter Sculthorpe Fellowship for a couple of years from 2017.

He released his first EP, DOBBY, in 2018. In October of that year, he appeared in Adelaide as part of the OzAsia Festival, headlining a show at Nexus Arts, supported by DyspOra and ELSY. 
 
In April 2019 DOBBY appeared at the Boomerang Festival, a section of Bluesfest at Byron Bay dedicated to Indigenous performance, art and culture. In October 2019 he again appeared at OzAsia in Adelaide, this time with folk artist Naomi Keyte, and accompanied by the five-piece Afro-jazz band Didier Kumalo (led by guitarist Dylan Marshall, founding member of the Shaolin Afronauts). The online magazine Clothesline gave the performance five stars. Also in 2019, he released a cover version of "We Have Survived" by Aboriginal band No Fixed Address.

His 2020 single "I can't breathe", featuring BARKAA, became an anthem for the Black Lives Matter movement in Australia, and has been incorporated into some school curricula. The song references a number of issues specific to Indigenous Australians, such as the forced removal of children from families in the past, the high levels of Indigenous Australian incarceration, Aboriginal deaths in custody.

For years before 2021 and continuing, he has been working on a major project called Marshmallow, an 18-track work. In 2021 he and his band toured extensively in regional areas across Australia, including Brewarrina, as well as capital cities, including Brisbane.

DOBBY performed alongside BARKAA at the Sydney New Year's Eve celebrations in 2021/22.

In June 2022, DOBBY presented WARRANGU; River Story at the Art Gallery of New South Wales in partnership with Vivid Sydney. The project is an eight-track video which tells a story about the use and misuse of the land and rivers around the river system around Brewarrina.

In November 2022, he collaborated with other First Nations artists Emma Donovan, Emily Wurramara, Drmngnow, and Optamus to create a song in memory of Cassius Turvey, a Noongar-Yamatji boy who had died at the age of 15 the result of an assault by a random attacker when walking home from school in Perth, Western Australia. The song, titled "Forever 15", was played at Turvey's funeral on 18 November 2022 and was released three days later on 21 November 2022.

Jackie Brown Jr
DOBBY raps with a band called Jackie Brown Jr. The five members of the indie rock and soul band met while studying music in 2013. In October 2018 they released their debut EP Over-Abroad, and toured the country during the following two months. The band members are:
Madeleine Mallis (of Good Pash) – lead vocalist and saxophonist
Rhyan Clapham (DOBBY) – drummer, MC
Michael J Brady –  guitarist and keyboard player 
Gideon Traurig – bass
Hilary Geddes (of The Buoys) – guitar

Musical style and themes
DOBBY believes that hip hop music is a powerful educational tool:

He is passionate about reconciliation in Australia, which needs action, not just words; everyone in Australia can contribute to this in different ways. He believes in using his music to help reconciliation.

Other activities
DOBBY is also a workshop facilitator and speaker. In 2018, he spoke at Vivid Ideas at Sydney's Vivid festival, and in 2019 at the JLF Adelaide (Jaipur Literature Festival in Adelaide, South Australia).

He co-hosted a hip hop show on FBi Radio with Krystel Diola from 2016 until 2019. Diola is a Filipina-Australian multi-instrumentalist, who toured with DOBBY as part of his band in 2021.

Recognition and awards
In 2017 Clapham was awarded the Peter Sculthorpe Fellowship, an award for emerging composers and performers worth . He used the award to develop his musicianship, and, in particular, to further his work on the stories of the Brewarrina Ngunnhu (Ngemba for "fish traps"). This led to the creation of WARRANGU; River Story, which premiered at Art Gallery NSW in June 2022.

In 2020, his music video for "I can't breathe" (directed by Luke Currie-Richardson and Benjamin Ling) won best video at the FBi SMAC Awards.

National Indigenous Music Awards
The National Indigenous Music Awards is an annual awards ceremony that recognises the achievements of Indigenous Australians in music.

! 
|-
! scope="row" rowspan="2"| 2022
|rowspan="2"| Dobby
| New Talent of the Year
| 
| rowspan="2"| 
|-
| Archie Roach Foundation Award
| 
|}

Discography

Extended Plays

Singles

Other appearances

References

External

Australian hip hop musicians
Australian male rappers
Indigenous Australian musicians
21st-century Australian musicians
Living people
Year of birth missing (living people)
People from Wollongong
Australian people of Filipino descent